Harold Noyes (12 August 1892 – 14 July 1968) was an Australian cricketer. He played in six first-class matches for Queensland between 1924 and 1927.

See also
 List of Queensland first-class cricketers

References

External links
 

1892 births
1968 deaths
Australian cricketers
Queensland cricketers
People from Warwick, Queensland
Cricketers from Queensland